Raymond Scott Dingle is a United States Army lieutenant general who serves as the 45th Surgeon General of the United States Army and Commanding General, United States Army Medical Command. Dingle graduated from Morgan State University in 1988 with a Bachelor of Science in Sociology, and has Master's degrees in Administration from Central Michigan University, Military Arts and Science from the School of Advanced Military Studies, and in National Security Strategy from the National War College. At the time of his selection, Dingle was serving as Deputy Surgeon General and Deputy Commanding General (Support) of the United States Army Medical Command in Falls Church, Virginia.

Dingle became acting United States Army Surgeon General after the July 19, 2019 retirement of Lieutenant General Nadja West. He was nominated for promotion to lieutenant general and permanent assignment as the United States Army Surgeon General on July 22, 2019, and confirmed by the Senate on September 26, 2019. Dingle was promoted to lieutenant general on October 17, 2019 by the Chief of Staff of the United States Army, General James C. McConville.

Awards and recognitions

References

Living people
Year of birth missing (living people)
Place of birth missing (living people)
Morgan State University alumni
Central Michigan University alumni
National War College alumni
United States Army generals